Sunjammer (Solar Sail Demonstrator) was a NASA mission intended to demonstrate a solar sail constructed by LGarde, but was canceled before launch. The largest solar sail made as of 2013, Sunjammer was named after a 1964  Arthur C. Clarke story of the same name, Sunjammer, in which several solar sails compete in a race to the Moon. Sunjammer was slated to launch in January 2015 as the secondary payload of a SpaceX Falcon 9 launch vehicle, along with the Earth observation satellite DSCOVR. Citing a lack of confidence in its contractor's ability to deliver, the mission was canceled in October 2014.

Spacecraft design 
Once in space, the large surface area of the solar sail would allow it to achieve a thrust of about 0.01 N and a characteristic acceleration of about 0.25 mm/s2. To control its orientation, and via this its speed and direction, Sunjammer was to use gimballed vanes (each of which is itself a small solar sail) located at the tips of each of its 4 booms, instead of thrusters, eliminating the need for any propellant other than the rays of the Sun.

In addition to being a demonstration craft, Sunjammer was to collect scientific data in its own right. With several instruments to detect various aspects of space weather, Sunjammer could have eventually become part of a larger network of solar sails studying the Sun, allowing for the creation of a more robust early-warning system for space weather.

Mission 
Prior to its cancellation, Sunjammer was slated for launch in January 2015 aboard a Falcon 9 launch vehicle, a slight delay from an earlier projection of November 2014. It was to launch as a secondary payload along with the primary DSCOVR Earth observation and space weather satellite. Within two months of launch the spacecraft was to test various technologies, such as deployment, vector control via altitude vanes, and eventually reaching a location near the Earth-Sun L1 Lagrange point.

Payloads 
Sunjammer was to carry two British space science payloads: the Solar Wind Analyser (SWAN) developed by the Mullard Space Science Laboratory of University College London, and the MAGIC magnetometer developed by the Blackett Laboratory of Imperial College London.

Sunjammer was to carry a Celestis Memorial Spaceflight payload of cremated remains.

See also 

 CubeSail
 CubeSail (UltraSail)
 IKAROS, a Japanese solar sail, launched in May 2010
 LightSail, a controlled solar sail CubeSat to launch in 2018
 NanoSail-D2, the successor to NanoSail-D, launched in November 2010
 Near-Earth Asteroid Scout, a solar sail CubeSat planned to launch in 2022

References

External links 
 Sunjammer Solar Sail Mission Sunjammermission.com web site
 Sunjammer  L'Garde Inc. Sunjammer page
 Solar Sail Demonstration (The Sunjammer Project) NASA Sunjammer Mission page
 The Sunjammer Solar Sail: Making Your Loved One Part of Space History Celestis Sunjammer page
 Sunjammer Space and Atmospheric Physics Group, Imperial College London

Solar sail spacecraft
Satellites of the United States
Cancelled spacecraft
Projects disestablished in 2014